Cesare Rossi may refer to:

 Cesare Rossi (politician) (1887–1967), Italian fascist leader
 Cesare Rossi (rower) (1904–1952), Italian rower
 Cesare Rossi (businessman)